Brattleboro Memorial Hospital, is a hospital in Brattleboro, Vermont.

Brattleboro Memorial Hospital is a community hospital which has been serving greater Brattleboro and the tri-state area since 1904. The BMH Medical Staff claims to employ more than 130 board-certified physicians, active in both primary care and many specialties.

Notes

Hospital buildings completed in 1904
Hospitals in Vermont
Buildings and structures in Brattleboro, Vermont
1904 establishments in Vermont